Mats Ytter (born 23 July 1963) is a retired Swedish ice hockey player. Ytter was part of the Djurgården Swedish champions' team of 1989. Ytter made 21 Elitserien appearances for Djurgården.

References

Swedish ice hockey players
Djurgårdens IF Hockey players
1963 births
Living people